The Catholic Church in Lesotho is part of the worldwide Catholic Church, under the spiritual leadership of the Pope in Rome. Approximately 90 percent of the population are Christians, of whom half are Catholics. Muslims, members of other non-Christian religions, and atheists constitute the remaining 10 percent. Christians are scattered throughout the country, while Muslims live mainly in the northeastern part of the country. Most practitioners of Islam are of Asian origin, while the majority of Christians are the indigenous Basotho.

Many Christians still practice their traditional cultural beliefs and rituals along with Christianity.  The Catholic Church has fused some aspects of local culture into its services.  For example, the singing of hymns during services has developed into a local and traditional way of singing (a repetitive call and response style) in Sesotho, the indigenous language, as well as English. In addition priests are seen dressed in local dress during services.

There are three main missionary groups, all of which are Christian, active in the country: Catholics, Protestants, and Anglicans.

The prominent role of the Catholic Church in the country derives from the successful establishment of Catholic schools in the last century and their influence over education policy. The Catholic Church used to own about 75 percent of all primary and secondary schools in the country, and was instrumental in establishing the National University of Lesotho; as of 2007, however, it owns less than 40 percent of the primary and secondary schools.

The Catholic Church helped found the Basotho National Party (BNP) in 1959 and sponsored it in the independence elections in 1966.  Most members of the BNP are practicing Catholics. The BNP ruled the country from independence in 1966 until 1985 when it was overthrown in a military coup. The then-opposition Basutoland Congress Party (BCP) historically has been aligned with the Protestant Lesotho Evangelical Church.

There are 4 dioceses including one archdiocese:

Maseru
Leribe
Mohale’s Hoek
Qacha’s Nek

See also
List of saints from Africa

References

 
Lesotho
Lesotho